Roy Hamilton (April 16, 1929 – July 20, 1969) was an American singer.  By combining semi-classical technique with traditional black gospel feeling, he brought soul to Great American Songbook singing.

Hamilton's greatest commercial success came from 1954 through 1961, when he was Epic Records' most prolific artist. His two most influential recordings, "You'll Never Walk Alone" and "Unchained Melody", became Epic's first two number-one hits when they topped the Billboard R&B chart in March 1954 and May 1955, respectively. Hamilton became the first solo artist in the label's history to have a US top-ten pop hit when "Unchained Melody" peaked at No. 6 in May 1955.

Early life
Roy Hamilton was born Leesburg, Georgia to Evelyn and Albert Hamilton, where he began singing in church choirs at the age of six. In the summer of 1943, when Hamilton was fourteen, the family migrated north to Jersey City, New Jersey in search of a better life. There, he sang with the Central Baptist Church Choir, New Jersey's most famous African American church choir. At Lincoln High School, he studied commercial art and was gifted enough to place his paintings with a number of New York City galleries.

In February 1947, seventeen-year-old Hamilton took his first big step into secular music, winning a talent contest at the Apollo Theater. But nothing came of it. "I couldn't get a break," Hamilton recalled. "I really had nothing different to offer. They were seeking blues singers at the time, and I didn't know any blues at all." So, to support himself while he developed the different sound and singing style he wanted, Hamilton worked as an electronics technician during the day, and an amateur heavyweight boxer at night, with a record of six wins and one defeat.

In 1948, Hamilton joined the Searchlight Gospel Singers and also studied light opera, working with New Jersey voice coach J. Martin Rolls for more than a year. Hamilton continued to perform gospel with the Searchlight Singers, in churches and at gospel concerts, until 1953 when the group broke up and each member went off in his own direction. Hamilton headed back into pop music. But this time, he felt he finally had something different to offer.

In 1948, when Hamilton was 19, he married Corene Hamilton, with whom he had five children, Rodothas Jr., Allan, Carolyn, Charnette, and Tyrone. They divorced in 1960. Hamilton later married Myrna Hamilton, with whom he had 2 sons, Roy Hamilton Jr. and Ray Hamilton. Both sons are actively involved in the music and entertainment industry.

Music career

Epic beginning and career rise (1953–1956)
In mid-1953, Hamilton was discovered singing in a Newark, New Jersey night club, The Caravan, by Bill Cook, who became his manager. Cook was the first African American radio disc jockey and television personality on the East Coast. Cook made a demo tape of Hamilton's singing and brought it to the attention of Columbia Records.  Columbia was impressed enough to sign Hamilton to their rhythm and blues subsidiary, Okeh Records. On November 11, 1953, Hamilton made his first recordings for the label in New York City.  The session produced Rodgers and Hammerstein's "You'll Never Walk Alone" from the musical Carousel. The tune, one of the few secular numbers that Hamilton knew at the time, had been his live-performance specialty since 1947.
But before it was released, Columbia had second thoughts and placed Hamilton with their newly-launched "pop" subsidiary label Epic. In the early 1950s, there were only two black male singers who were widely accepted by white audiences as mainstream pop stars: Nat King Cole and Billy Eckstine. Epic saw that same kind of "crossover" star potential in Hamilton, placing a nearly full-page ad in the January 23, 1954 edition of Billboard magazine which read, "a great new voice makes news with a great song!  Roy Hamilton, You’ll Never Walk Alone…" In spite of poor musical backing, Hamilton's performance on "Walk Alone" is sensational and is the primary reason why it topped the Billboard R&B chart for eight weeks and became a national US Top-30 hit. His follow-up single, "If I Loved You", was another Rodgers and Hammerstein tune from Carousel.  Although not as big a hit for Hamilton as "Walk Alone", it still reached number four on the US R&B chart.

On the evening of July 24, 1954, Hamilton appeared on the bill of "Star Night", a concert package at Chicago's Soldier Field starring Perry Como, Nat King Cole and Sarah Vaughan. Since he was the newcomer on the bill, Hamilton was given the least amount of time to perform: six minutes, to perform two songs.  Hamilton's plan was to perform "You'll Never Walk Alone", the only song he was known for at the time, and its bouncy b-side.  But Perry Como squashed that plan when he announced during afternoon rehearsal that "Walk Alone" was going to be his closing number that night.  Hamilton, forced into performing a "Walk Alone" replacement on the spot, decided on "Ebb Tide", a song that had been a hit for Vic Damone a few months earlier—a song that Hamilton himself hadn't yet recorded.  That evening, for his second and final number, Hamilton unveiled his gospel-tinged version of "Ebb Tide" before a Soldier Field audience of 82,000.  By the time he had finished singing and exited the stage, all 82,000 people were on their feet, applauding, stomping and chanting for more. Changing in his dressing room, Hamilton had to be summoned back out on stage to quiet the crowd.  He returned to the stage to witness that even some of his fellow performers—Nat Cole, Sarah Vaughan and orchestra leader Ray Anthony—had joined in the ovation. On July 28, four days after his "Star Night" triumph, Epic Records had Hamilton record, "Ebb Tide". It became his third straight hit.

On Saturday night, September 11, 1954, Hamilton made his national television debut on CBS's Stage Show, hosted by big band leaders and brothers Tommy and Jimmy Dorsey. But the national television appearance that put Hamilton's career on the fast track to crossover success was the one he made on the night of March 6, 1955 when he sang "You'll Never Walk Alone" on CBS's top-rated Ed Sullivan Show.  In reviewing his performance, Variety magazine summed up Hamilton's new way of singing the Great American Songbook by writing: "Hamilton made good with his single, 'You'll Never Walk Alone', which he endowed with the values of a spiritual."

Ten days after the Sullivan Show appearance, Epic, in a rushed attempt to cover singer Al Hibbler's version of "Unchained Melody", set up a recording session for Hamilton. The resulting single was shipped within five days. Two months later, in the May 18, 1955 issue of Down Beat magazine, Hamilton was named "Vocalist of the Year".  Meanwhile, in Billboard magazine's May 21, 1955 issue, Hamilton's gospel-tinged "Unchained Melody" had taken over the top spot on the R&B chart while, on the pop chart, it had reached the number six spot.  It was the second number-one R&B hit of his career as well as the first, and only, top-ten US pop hit of his career.

On the heels of his "Unchained Melody" success, Hamilton recorded the following Great American Songbook singles in succession: Vincent Youmans' "Without a Song" (#77 US pop), Jimmy McHugh's "Cuban Love Song", Rodgers and Hammerstein's "Everybody's Got a Home But Me" (#42 US pop), from the musical Pipe Dream, and Frank Loesser's "Somebody Somewhere", from the musical The Most Happy Fella.

Retirement and comeback (1956–1962)

In mid-1956, Hamilton, developing what was described as a "lung condition" bordering on tuberculosis, announced an indefinite retirement from show business, citing both physical and mental exhaustion When he resumed his career over a year later, Hamilton could no longer generate hit singles performing pop standards because, overnight, rock and roll had become the record industry's predominant commercial force.  So, in late 1957, Epic coaxed Hamilton into recording "Don't Let Go", an R&B rocker produced by Otis Blackwell, the man who had written the two biggest number-one hits of Elvis Presley's career: "Don't Be Cruel" and "All Shook Up". By early 1958, "Don't Let Go" had become the second US top-15 pop hit of Hamilton's career and the first top-40 hit ever recorded in stereo.

In 1959, Hamilton appeared, in a cameo role, in the Filipino motion picture produced by People's Pictures Hawaiian Boy where he sings "Unchained Melody".

Hamilton's last hit record, "You Can Have Her" (the song spent 10 weeks on the Billboard Hot 100, reaching No. 12, while reaching No. 6 on Billboard's Hot R&B Sides chart.), came in 1961, and was followed by the album Mr. Rock And Soul (1962). The Epic label treated Hamilton as a major star and issued sixteen albums by him.

Later years (1963–1969)
By the mid-1960s, Hamilton's career declined while recording with MGM and then RCA.

In January 1969, in Memphis, Tennessee, Hamilton made the final recordings of his career.  The tracks were laid down at record producer Chips Moman's American Sound Studio, at the same time Elvis Presley was recording there.  Songs released from those Hamilton sessions were cover versions of James Carr's "The Dark End of the Street", Conway Twitty's "It's Only Make Believe", and "Angelica", a Barry Mann and Cynthia Weil song that had been submitted to Presley, but which he then turned over to Hamilton.

Death
In early July 1969, Hamilton suffered a massive cerebral hemorrhage at his home in New Rochelle, New York. He was taken to New Rochelle General Hospital where he lay in a coma for more than a week. On July 20, 1969, he was removed from life support and died.  Hamilton was 40 years old. Some connected his earlier illness that caused his retirement to his death, although a connection was never proven. 

In a 2017 documentary for the BBC, Hamilton’s son Roy Hamilton Jr. revealed that Elvis Presley sent Roy's wife, Myrna, a rose every day Hamilton was in the hospital. When Hamilton passed away from complications of his stroke, Presley sent Myrna flowers for the following six months. 

At the time of his death, Hamilton was heavily in debt, forcing him, a week before he died, to borrow heavily on his insurance policy to pay off back taxes. This prompted his widow, Myrna, to publicly seek funds for his burial. Elvis Presley is said to have covered Hamilton’s outstanding medical bills and funeral costs. At Hamilton's funeral service, messages of condolence sent by Presley, Mahalia Jackson and B.B. King were read out to the mourners.

Legacy
Hamilton was inducted into the Georgia Music Hall of Fame in 2010.

Hamilton was Epic Records' first star, giving the company its first number-one hit of any kind, "You'll Never Walk Alone", which topped the Billboard R&B chart for eight weeks in 1954. A year later, he gave the label its second number-one hit of any kind when his version of "Unchained Melody" topped the Billboard R&B chart for three weeks. Also, with "Unchained Melody", Hamilton became the first solo artist to deliver a top-ten pop hit for Epic.

Hamilton was the singer who inspired Sam Cooke, then a gospel music star, to switch over to secular music.  Hamilton was also the one to whom Cooke first submitted his early pop-song compositions.

Hamilton's distinctive sound was a big influence on Elvis Presley's ballad singing. As author Fred L. Worth noted, "Elvis greatly admired Hamilton's singing ability and style and performed a number of his ballads in Hamilton's style."
Also, The Righteous Brothers emulated Hamilton's style to create their blue-eyed soul sound.  This is particularly evident in the duo's cover versions of his hits "You'll Never Walk Alone", "Ebb Tide" and "Unchained Melody".

Hamilton's "You'll Never Walk Alone" disc was brought in from the US by a sailor friend of Gerry and the Pacemakers leader Gerry Marsden. As a result, the band recorded a UK version of the song which became the anthem for Liverpool Football Club, sung by the crowd before every home game. The sailor friend noted that Marsden "puts very similar inflections into the song, trying to get it very similar to Roy Hamilton's version."

Discography

Singles

Studio albums

Compilation albums

Filmography
1958: Let's Rock, appeared as himself
1959: Hawaiian Boy, appeared as himself. Drama, Musical

Television appearances

Bibliography
 Guralnick, Peter (1999): Careless Love: The Unmaking of Elvis Presley, Little, Brown and Company, London.  
 Guralnick, Peter (2005): Dream Boogie: The Triumph of Sam Cooke, Little, Brown and Company, New York.

References

External links 
The Official Roy Hamilton tribute site
  Don't Let Go: Roy Hamilton

1929 births
1969 deaths
American rhythm and blues musicians
Epic Records artists
RCA Victor artists
MGM Records artists
People from Leesburg, Georgia
Musicians from New Rochelle, New York
Singers from Georgia (U.S. state)
20th-century African-American male singers